Sterphus coeruleus is a species of Hoverfly in the family Syrphidae.

Distribution
Chile, Argentina.

References

Eristalinae
Insects described in 1863
Diptera of South America
Taxa named by Camillo Rondani